The decade of the 1150s in art involved some significant events.

Works
 1156: Stavelot Triptych created by Mosan artists

Births
 1151: Unkei – Japanese sculptor (died 1223)
 1150: Benedetto Antelami – Italian architect and sculptor of the Romanesque school (died 1230)

Art
Decades of the 12th century in art